Chigley (1969) is the third and final stop-motion children's television series in Gordon Murray's Trumptonshire trilogy. Production details are identical to Camberwick Green.

As in Camberwick Green and Trumpton, the action centres on a small community, the village of Chigley, near Camberwick Green in Trumptonshire. Chigley is more of an industrial area than Camberwick Green.

A digitally restored version of the series from the rediscovered original film masters emerged in 2012.

Overview
Winkstead Hall, a stately home, is central to life in Chigley. The aristocratic owner, Lord Belborough, and his butler Brackett, also operate a heritage railway. They are called on to transport or collect goods in every episode, much to Lord Belborough's delight, as he loves driving the engine, Bessie. Another character frequently delighted by these excursions is Winnie Farthing, whom Lord Belborough and Brackett nearly always invite to join them for a train ride. The notable song unique to Chigley, "Time flies by when I'm the driver of a train", was always sung during these sequences. Winkstead Hall and its grounds are regularly opened to the public, who have access to the picture gallery and tea gardens (both regularly seen). Other parts of the Hall and its estate which also feature in the programmes include the library, the hall, the kitchen garden (and greenhouses), the engine shed (home of Bessie), and the pump room (home of Binnie, Lord Belborough's stationary steam beam engine).

Chigley features many guest appearances by characters from the previous two series. This was at least partly for economic reasons, as it allowed the re-use of theme songs and puppets, thus saving money on recording and manufacture.

Lord Belborough invites everyone to the grounds of Winkstead Hall after the daily 6 o'clock whistle (which marks the end of the day's work at the local biscuit factory), when he plays his vintage Dutch organ, while the workers dance. This scene forms the conclusion of each episode.

Episodes
"Lord Belborough's Secret" (6 October 1969) Dr Mopp
"Bessie to the Rescue" (13 October 1969) Farmer Bell
"The Balloon" (20 October 1969) The Mayor
"The Fountain" (27 October 1969) PC McGarry
"The Garden Wall" (3 November 1969) Mr Crockett
"Binnie and Bessie" (10 November 1969) Roger Varley
"Lord Belborough's Lucky Day" (17 November 1969) Thomas Tripp
"The Broken Bridge" (24 November 1969) Mr Carraway
"Clay for Mr Farthing" (1 December 1969) Mr Wantage and Fred
"Trouble with the Crane" (8 December 1969) Mr Rumpling
"Apples Galore" (15 December 1969) Mickey Murphy
"Willie Munn" (22 December 1969) Mr Clamp
"A Present for Lord Belborough" (29 December 1969) Mr Antonio

Episode titles were given in Radio Times but were not shown on-screen.

Characters

Winkstead Hall
The Winkstead Hall estate is a large stately home whose activities, including a heritage railway, dominate life in Chigley village.
 Lord Belborough – the owner of the hall, a peer of the realm, and driver of the steam locomotive Bessie; he appears in every episode.
 Mr Brackett – Lord Belborough's butler, and fireman on the steam railway; he appears in every episode.
 Mr Bilton – Lord Belborough's gardener, who suffers with rheumatism; he appears in 3 episodes.
 Mr Roger Varley – the Camberwick Green chimney sweep is also employed part-time at Winkstead Hall as maintenance engineer for the steam engines Bessie and Binnie; he appears in 2 episodes.

The Villagers
Only a relatively small number of Chigley villagers are introduced in the series, as many storylines involve existing Trumpton or Camberwick Green characters visiting Chigley.
 Mr Swallow – the wharfinger at Treddle's Wharf, at the intersection of Trumpton Canal with both road and rail networks; he appears in 10 episodes.
 Mr Harry Farthing – the potter at Chigley Pottery, who is also a sculptor; he appears in 8 episodes.
 Winnie Farthing – the potter's daughter; a frequent train passenger, she appears in 10 episodes.
 Mr S. Rumpling – the bargee, whose canal boat (based at Chigley and registered at Trumpton) is a major source of supply to the village; he appears in 6 episodes.
 Mr Clutterbuck – the local builder; he appears in 2 episodes.
 Horace – a labourer employed by Mr Clutterbuck; he appears in 1 episode.
 Cyril – a labourer employed by Mr Clutterbuck; he appears in 1 episode.
 Corporation dustmen – the two corporation dustmen, one of whom is named as Harry, appear in 1 episode.
 Dancing women – two unnamed Chigley women dance with the factory workers at the six o'clock whistle; they appear in all 13 episodes.

The biscuit factory
The factory is the village's chief source of employment. Cresswell's Chigley Biscuits is the company which owns and operates the facility, and operates a fleet of delivery lorries transporting the finished biscuits from the factory to the railway station at Wintlebury.
 Mr Cresswell – the owner and general manager of the factory; he appears in 4 episodes, and is referenced in a fifth.
 Mr Fletcher – the loading bay supervisor; he appears in the closing dance scene of every episode, and in the storyline of 3 episodes.
 Mr McGregor – one of the delivery drivers; he is chiefly known for being unavailable for work in episode 12.
 Mr Patterson – one of the delivery drivers; he is commended for his skill in not knocking down Jimmy Rankin in episode 4.
 Willie Munn – works on the biscuit cutting machine; he is the nephew of Mr Clamp, the Trumpton greengrocer, and he has a starring role in episode 12.
 The workers – a large number of unnamed factory workers are seen throughout the series, in and around the factory, and at the evening dance after the six o'clock whistle; they appear in every episode; the number of workers is unknown, but at least 16, as that number are seen on screen together at the six o'clock whistle.

Visitors
Chigley was frequently visited by tradesmen and other characters from neighbouring communities, allowing the re-use of Trumpton and Camberwick Green figures.

Unseen characters
 Mrs Tripp – the milkman's wife
 Mrs McGarry – the policeman's wife
 Millicent Mopp – the doctor's sister
 Mr Wilkins – the Trumpton plumber
 Jimmy Rankin – a boy who narrowly avoided being knocked down by a Cresswell's delivery van

Home releases
In 1984, 15 years after its broadcast on the BBC in 1969. Longman Video released one video with the first four episodes as part of its 'Children's Treasury' collection.

5 years later, in 1989, the BBC released a video with the three more episodes (ep.13 A Present for Lord Belborough, ep.11 Apples Garlore and ep.10 Trouble with the Crane).
 

And in 1996–1997, Telstar Video Entertainment released two videos as part of its 'Star Kids' range.

In 2011, Chigley and the two earlier series Camberwick Green and Trumpton were digitally-restored from the rediscovered original film masters.

Credits
 Script & Puppets: Gordon Murray
 Music: Freddie Phillips
 Narrator: Brian Cant
 Sets: Andrew & Margaret Brownfoot
 Animation: Bob Bura & John Hardwick
 Assistant Animators: Pasquale Ferrare, George Dubouch
 Recording & Sound Effects: Music Features MF
 A Gordon Murray Production MCMLXIX.

Cultural references
 The indie group Half Man Half Biscuit parodied the Chigley Train Song in their song "Time Flies By (When You're the Driver of a Train)". They also released a single entitled "The Trumpton riots" containing many character references.
 In the comic book Preacher, the train song was sung by Jesus de Sade, a sexually depraved character, whilst riding a bicycle, naked.
 The Oasis song "Champagne Supernova" contains the line "Slowly walking down the hall, faster than a cannonball". This was, according to lead guitarist and songwriter Noel Gallagher, inspired by Brackett the butler from Chigley.
 In the first episode of the 2003 BBC sitcom Early Doors, bar patrons Joe and Duffy et al. tease bartender Ken about his hobby train set by serenading him with the first line of the Chigley Train Song.

References and notes

External links
The Trumptonshire Trilogy
The Trumptonshire Web
BBC Radio 4 Sunday Best – Here is a Box, a Musical Box
 

BBC children's television shows
British children's animated adventure television series
Fictional populated places in England
British stop-motion animated television series
1960s British animated television series
1960s British children's television series
1969 British television series debuts
1969 British television series endings
English-language television shows